Caffeine-Free Coca-Cola was introduced in 1983 as a caffeine-free variant of Coca-Cola. It was introduced to compete against Pepsi Free, which is now called Caffeine-Free Pepsi. The diet variant, Caffeine-Free Diet Coke, was the first variant of Diet Coke and was introduced in 1984, one year after the regular Coke version. In 2013, Caffeine-Free Coca-Cola Zero was introduced in America.

In April 1985, Caffeine-Free Coca-Cola was switched to the unpopular New Coke formula and did not switch back to the Coca-Cola Classic formula until 1989. The word "Classic" was removed from the label in spring 2011 in the U.S.

As of August 2022, Caffeine-Free Coca-Cola is not readily available in stores. It has not been readily available since 2020. The explanation given by various non-official sources is that due to a shortage of aluminum cans due to COVID-19 related issues, less popular products are in short supply.  However, there is no current shortage of aluminum cans. The bottled 2-litre edition of the product has also been in short supply.

As of March 9, 2023 there were a 12 pack of cans found at a Stater Bros. market in Orange County Ca. Caffeine-Free Coke is back on the shelves.

See also 
 Coca-Cola
 Diet Coke
 Coke Zero Sugar

References

External links

 

Coca-Cola cola brands
Products introduced in 1983